Anthoptus is a genus of skippers in the family Hesperiidae.

Species
Recognised species in the genus Anthoptus include:
 Anthoptus epictetus (Fabricius, 1793)
 Anthoptus inculta (Dyar, 1918)
 Anthoptus insignis Plötz, 1882

References

Natural History Museum Lepidoptera genus database

Hesperiinae
Hesperiidae genera